The Days and Nights of Molly Dodd is an American comedy-drama television series that aired on NBC from May 21, 1987 to June 29, 1988 and on Lifetime from April 17, 1989 to April 13, 1991. It was created by Jay Tarses and stars Blair Brown in the title role.

Premise
The show depicts the life of Molly Bickford Dodd, a divorced woman in New York City with a lifestyle that could be described as both yuppie and bohemian. Molly seems to drift from job to job and relationship to relationship. Her ex-husband, a ne'er-do-well jazz musician, still cares for her. In fact, nearly every man (and the occasional woman) she meets adores her. Her warmth and emotional accessibility are the root cause of most of Molly's problems in life. The BBC's Radio Times characterised the show as "An American comedy-drama series starring Blair Brown intelligent, attractive and independent, Molly Dodd has the world at her feet - so why must it always trip her up?

Cast
 Blair Brown as Molly Dodd
 James Greene as Davey McQuinn, elevator operator/doorman
 Allyn Ann McLerie as Florence Bickford, Molly's mother
 William Converse-Roberts as Fred Dodd, Molly's ex-husband
 Richard Lawson as Det. Nathaniel Hawthorne, one of Molly's romantic interests
 David Strathairn as Moss Goodman, one of Molly's romantic interests

Additional cast included:
 Maureen Anderman as her best friend Nina. 
 Sandy Faison as Mamie Grolnick, Molly’s younger sister.
 Victor Garber as Dennis Widmer
 Richard Venture as Edgar Bickford, Molly's father 
 George Gaynes, John Pankow, J. Smith-Cameron, and Lewis Black.

Episodes
NOTE: Production Codes were taken from the Library of Congress.

Season 1 (1987)

Season 2 (1988)

Season 3 (1989)

Season 4 (1990)

Season 5 (1991)

Production
The Days and Nights of Molly Dodd had story lines that often did not resolve in a single episode.

The show was filmed using a single camera. 

Production took place in Hollywood for the first two seasons before moving to Kaufman Astoria Studios in New York in season 3.

Tarses wrote and directed many of its episodes (and made a number of cameo appearances).

Reception and network change
NBC first broadcast the show as a summer replacement in 1987 running 13 episodes. Molly Dodd was critically acclaimed and a moderate ratings success (it was featured in the network's then-powerhouse Thursday night lineup), but was not featured in the network's fall schedule.  It was a mid-season replacement for NBC again in spring 1988, with 12 episodes (a season-ending 13th episode was produced but not aired). NBC canceled Molly Dodd after this second short  season.

After it was canceled by NBC, Lifetime cable network picked the show up, first re-airing the 26 episodes originally produced, then commissioning three more 13-episode seasons for 1989, 1990, and 1991. When they were rerun on Lifetime, the original 26 episodes were time-sped (usually during both acts), and the opening titles were trimmed. After production ceased, Lifetime would continue to air Molly Dodd in reruns until 1993.

Awards and nominations
The show earned Brown five Emmy Award nominations as Outstanding Lead Actress in a Comedy Series, one for each year the show was on. Brown won a CableACE Award for Best Actress in a Dramatic Series in 1991, while the fifth and final Season was airing. Tarses was also the recipient of multiple nominations.

Music rights
Despite some demand for the show on DVD or streaming services, the original producers did not clear music rights for subsequent broadcast. Although Brown often sang as Molly, the cost to secure the rights to the music itself would be substantial. In an interview, Brown indicated "all the songs that I sang, they never got the rights. So [the show is] in a vault somewhere and will never see the light of day."

References

External links

The Days and Nights of Molly Dodd at epguides.com
Richard Lawson Official Website: The Days and Nights of Molly Dodd – features the video clip of Molly and Nathaniel's first meeting, plus other clips and production stills

1987 American television series debuts
1991 American television series endings
1980s American comedy-drama television series
1990s American comedy-drama television series
American television series revived after cancellation
English-language television shows
Lifetime (TV network) original programming
NBC original programming
Television series by Warner Bros. Television Studios
Television shows filmed in New York (state)
Television shows set in New York City